The Swedish National Institute of Economic Research (KI or NIER) is a government agency in Sweden responsible for economic analysis and forecasting. The NIER is publicly funded, although it does accept a small number of private commissions.  It employs over 60 people, primarily economists.

External links
National Institute of Economic Research - Official site

Institute of Economic Research
Economy of Sweden
Economic research institutes
Public finance of Sweden
Forecasting organizations